The 2014 Thai FA Cup is the 21st season of Thailand knockout football competition. The tournament is organized by the Football Association of Thailand.

The cup winner is guaranteed a place in the 2015 AFC Champions League Play-off.

Results

Preliminary round
The preliminary round consists of two rounds for teams currently playing in the Regional League Division 2 level. The first round was held on 19 March 2014.

First round

Second round

Third round

Fourth round

Quarterfinal

Semifinal

Final

See also
 2014 Thai Premier League
 2014 Thai Division 1 League
 2014 Regional League Division 2
 2014 Thai League Cup
 2014 Kor Royal Cup
 Thai Premier League All-Star Football

References

Thai FA Cup seasons
1